is a town in Tamana District, Kumamoto Prefecture, Japan.

As of October 1, 2016, the town has an estimated population of 9,572 and a density of 140 persons per km². The total area is 68.92 km². 
The town's main crops are rice and bamboo.

References

External links

Nankan official website 

Towns in Kumamoto Prefecture